Joel Sunday (born 31 December 1988) is a Nigerian professional footballer who last played as a forward for I-League outfit TRAU FC.

Career

Aizawl
On 16 February 2016, Sunday was signed by the newly promoted I-League team Aizawl F.C. He was top scorer for the team with 7 goals in 12 games. He scored a winner in dying minutes against the defending champions Bengaluru FC in 2015–16 Indian Federation Cup.

Tollygunge Agragami FC
On 7 June 2016 Sunday signed for Calcutta Football League outfit SVF Tollygunge Agragami FC. Joel made his debut for Tollygunge Agragami on 28 July 2016 against Peerless SC and helped his team to draw the match 1–1 by scoring in the 81st minute.

Gokulam Kerala FC
In December 2018 Sunday signed for I-league outfit Gokulam Kerala F.C. as a replacement of their striker Antonio German. Joel found his first goal in his brace against his former club Aizawl F.C. but the club eventually lost to them.
He has recently signed for I-league outfits TRAU F.C. for the remainder of the 2019-20 season.

TRAU F.C.
He has recently signed for I-league outfits TRAU F.C. for the remainder of the 2019-20 season.

References

External links
 

Living people
1988 births
Aizawl FC players
I-League players
Nigerian footballers
Association football forwards
Calcutta Football League players
Tollygunge Agragami FC players